The 2003 Canadian Open curling men's Grand Slam tournament was held November 6–9, 2003 at the Keystone Centre in Brandon, Manitoba.

The total purse for the event was $100,000. The tournament format was a triple knock out with an 8 team playoff. The playoffs were televised on Rogers Sportsnet.

Glen Despins of Regina, Saskatchewan won his lone career grand slam event, earning $30,000 for his team.

Teams
The teams were as follows:

Knockout brackets

A Event 
Scores:

B Event 
Scores:

C Event 
Scores:

Playoffs
The playoff bracket was as follows:

References

External links
Event site (archived)

2003 in Canadian curling
Curling competitions in Brandon, Manitoba
2003
2003 in Manitoba
November 2003 sports events in Canada